Bovenkerk may refer to:

Bovenkerk, Amstelveen, a village in Amstelveen, North Holland
Bovenkerk, Krimpenerwaard, village in Krimpenerwaard, South Holland
Bovenkerk, Kampen, a large, Gothic church in Kampen, Overijssel